Chibnall is a surname. Notable people with the surname include:

Albert Chibnall FRS (1894–1988), British biochemist
Chris Chibnall (born 1970), English television writer and producer
Marjorie Chibnall OBE FBA (1915–2012), English historian

See also
Chibal (disambiguation)
Shobnall